Munsbach railway station is a railway station serving Munsbach, in the commune of Schuttrange, in southern Luxembourg.  It is operated by Chemins de Fer Luxembourgeois, the state-owned railway company.

The station is situated on Line 30, which connects Luxembourg City to the east of the country and Trier.

External links
 Official CFL page on Munsbach station
 Rail.lu page on Munsbach station

Schuttrange
Railway stations in Luxembourg
Railway stations on CFL Line 30